Dragon Quest Champions is a turn-based action role-playing video game developed by Omega Force, with Square Enix publishing. It is set to release on Android and iOS in Japan. It is a free-to-play entry in the  Dragon Quest series.

Gameplay
The game uses a turn-based role-playing command system, similar to mainline Dragon Quest titles, in which players explore open world areas and battle against enemies. A secondary mode, dubbed Tournament mode, has players fighting in real-time action role-playing Player versus player multiplayer matches against 50 other players, similar to battle royale video games.

Plot
After the Demon King was defeated by the Hero, the world has returned to peace. The "Heroic Martial Arts Tournament", hosted in honor of the hero, has since gained massive popularity. The player controls an adventurer who wants to become the new hero, as well as find their lost father. For that goal, they join the Heroic Martial Arts Tournament.

Development
On January 10, Square Enix announced that a new role-playing video game entry in the Dragon Quest series was in development for iOS and Android. The game was formally announced by Square Enix and Koei Tecmo on January 18, 2023. On the same day, a closed beta was announced, which would run between February 6 to 13 of the same year.

Notes

References

External links

Android (operating system) games
Free-to-play video games
IOS games
Multiplayer and single-player video games
Omega Force games
Open-world video games
Role-playing video games
Square Enix games
Video game sequels
Video games developed in Japan
Video games featuring protagonists of selectable gender
Upcoming video games